An extremely critical fire weather event is the greatest threat level issued by the NWS Storm Prediction Center (SPC) for wildfire events in the United States. Extremely critical areas are issued only several times a year when forecasters at the SPC are confident of extremely dangerous wildfire conditions on a given day. These are typically reserved for the most extreme events.

Fire weather products have been issued by the Storm Prediction Center since 1998, however there is little to no online documentation for days before 2000 due to the lack of online archives. Therefore, it is likely that there were additional extremely critical days from 1998 to 2000 that were not documented.

Extremely critical days

2000–2009

2010–2019

2020–present

See also
 List of deadliest Storm Prediction Center days by outlook risk level
 List of Storm Prediction Center high risk days

Notes

References 

National Weather Service
United States environment-related lists
Weather-related lists
Weather warnings and advisories
Wildfires in the United States